The Town of Greenbush is a former town in the state of New York. At first it was part of Albany County, then Rensselaer County, after the latter was created in 1791. The current towns of East Greenbush and North Greenbush were parts of the former Town of Greenbush. However, it also included the Village of Greenbush, incorporated in 1815, and the hamlets of Bath and East Albany. The Village of Greenbush, including Fort Crailo, was changed by the New York State Legislature to the City of Rensselaer in 1897. At that time the Village and Town of Greenbush ceased to exist.

Notable people
 Lucy Wood Butler (1820-1895), temperance leader
 Edmonia Lewis (1844–1907), sculptor

References

Further reading
 

Towns in Rensselaer County, New York
Former towns in New York (state)
Former villages in New York (state)
Villages in Rensselaer County, New York